This page is a season-by-season record of Olympique de Marseille's league and cup performance. For a written history and for a list of honours, see the club's main article.

Seasons

Legend

Pos = Final position ; Pts = Points; Pld = Matches played; W = Matches won; D = Matches drawn; L = Matches lost; GF = Goals for; GA = Goals against

Notes and references 

 
Marseille
Olympique